This is a list of Formula One broadcasters and 'World Feed' producers. Formula One, the highest level of circuit racing defined by the Fédération Internationale de l'Automobile, motor sport's world governing body, can be seen live or tape delayed on television in almost every country and territory around the world.

It attracts one of the largest global TV audiences after the FIFA World Cup and the Olympic Games, with a total global audience of about 352 million people for the 2017 season.

Overview

Previously, a 'host broadcaster' from each nation produced the World Feed for their home race, for example TF1 for the French Grand Prix. This led to a two-tier system which was unpopular with viewers due to local broadcasters focusing heavily on local teams and drivers, whilst missing key moments.

The World Feed has been produced in 16:9 widescreen since the 2007 Australian Grand Prix. Host Broadcasters did trialled widescreen broadcasts for local viewers sporadically prior to the 2007 season – FujiTV and Australia are some of the broadcasters who did.

For the 2011 season, FOM released a high definition feed to broadcasters for the first time, and for 2012, the footage was filmed with 5.1 channel Dolby Digital surround sound audio. From 2017, footage began being broadcast in 4K ultra-high definition.

For the 2018 season, the World Feed is produced by FOM for every race apart from the Monaco Grand Prix, which is produced by Télé Monte Carlo.

Alongside the main World Feed, FOM also produce a Pit-lane channel, showing shots from the pitlane and alternative camera angles, along with detailed weather and tyre information, and extra team radio. FOM also produce onboard channels, showing live video from cameras installed on the drivers' cars. The channels switch between different cars throughout the session. FOM also make available a "Driver tracker" channel, showing live positions of all the cars on the track during a session, as well as a timing screen showing live lap-times and circuit sector information.

Currently, broadcasters offering coverage of these FOM-produced extra channels include Sky Sports F1 (UK), Fox Sports Australia, Sky Sport F1 (Italy), Movistar F1 (Spain) and Play Sports (Belgium). Out of the 9 on board channels, Fox Sports Australia only shows the Master onboard channel to its viewers, whereas Sky Sports F1 makes all the on board channels available. The Pit lane, Driver Tracker and Live Timing channels are available to Sky viewers in the United Kingdom.

In 2018, FOM launched an over-the-top streaming platform known as F1 TV, providing live commercial-free coverage of all races including access to all on-board cameras. The service launched initially in Germany, France, the United States, Mexico, Belgium, Austria, Hungary and parts of Latin America.

Broadcasters

United Kingdom and Ireland
In 2011, Sky Sports signed a seven-year deal with the BBC (who had already had broadcasting rights for several years), to show live Formula One on Sky in the United Kingdom for the first time. The deal which ran between 2012 and 2015 saw Sky Sports show live coverage of every session of the season on their own F1 dedicated channel, Sky Sports F1. Sky Sports F1 show all races and qualifying sessions live without the interruption of adverts. In 2016, Sky extended their contract to 2024, and will be the exclusive live rights holders in the UK and Ireland from 2019; the British Grand Prix and highlights of all other races will be shown free-to-air, on a channel which has "90% technical availability". At the same time it was announced that Sky will broadcast all events in ultra-high-definition (UHD) from 2017. 
Sky Sports F1 have broadcast every practice, qualifying and race since 2017 in 4K Ultra-HD, exclusively for Sky Q 2TB customers.

BBC. Following the commencement of their deal with Sky, the BBC continued to broadcast live coverage of half the races and all 20 races had "extended highlights". In 2012, they broadcast live coverage from China, Spain, Monaco, Europe (Valencia), Britain, Belgium, Singapore, Korea, Abu Dhabi and Brazil. They also showed live coverage of practice and qualifying sessions from those races. The deal set that the British Grand Prix and the final race had to be shown live on the BBC.

For each Grand Prix (even if live) the BBC showed "extended highlights" of the race just a few hours after it had been broadcast. Late afternoon for early hours races and/or early evening. Late evening races were shown on the day and repeated on Monday evening. The BBC Radio 5 Live coverage was unaffected.

Due to financial pressures, the BBC ended their television contract early after the 2015 season, transferring their rights to Channel 4 until the end of the 2018 season. Sky Sports F1 remained unaffected and BBC Radio 5 Live and 5 Live Sports Extra's coverage was extended until 2021.

Channel 4, like the BBC before them, always shows the British Grand Prix and the final race live. Non-live races have "extended highlights" of the race shown a few hours after it has taken place. Highlights of races held early morning are broadcast mid-afternoon, with afternoon races shown early evening and late evening races shown later in the evening. Their live broadcasts for  until  were Bahrain, Spain, Europe, Britain, Hungary, Belgium, Italy, Malaysia, Mexico and Abu Dhabi. 
In July 2018, it was understood that Channel 4 were in final negotiations with Sky and Liberty Media to continue with the free-to-air rights. From 2019 to 2022 Channel 4 airs the British Grand Prix live plus the remaining races as highlights. In 2021, Sky Sports F1 partnered with Channel 4 to broadcast the season-concluding Abu Dhabi Grand Prix live and free-to-air.  In 2022, Sky recently extended their contract to 2029, and Channel 4 until 2023.

United States
Cable television network ESPN aired Formula One races in the United States between 1984 and 1997. From 1998 to 2000, coverage was split between Speedvision (full live coverage) and Fox Sports Net (usually taped delayed). From 2001 to 2012, Speedvision (later renamed Speed) had full coverage of the championship, with select races also airing on broadcast networks (ABC in early years, CBS in 2005, Fox from 2007 to 2012).

On 14 October 2012, NBC Sports signed a four-year deal to broadcast Formula One races in the United States. The majority of its coverage (including most races, and all practice/qualifying sessions) was broadcast by the pay channel NBCSN (with CNBC as an overflow channel), while four races were aired by the free-to-air NBC network per-season. The network also streamed additional camera feeds through its digital platforms.

On 4 October 2017, ESPN announced that it had acquired rights to Formula One under a multi-year deal beginning in 2018. ESPN had previously broadcast Formula One from 1984 to 1997. The majority of coverage will be carried by ESPN2, but two races (Monaco, Britain) will be carried on the main ESPN channel, and three races (Canada, United States and Mexico; it would later air the Miami Grand Prix starting in 2023), as well as an afternoon encore of the Monaco Grand Prix (following its Indianapolis 500 telecast in 2018), will be broadcast free-to-air on ABC. Unlike the previous contract with NBC Sports, Formula One will retain over-the-top rights, ESPN will reportedly not pay a traditional rights fee, and it was originally announced that the broadcasts would rely primarily on the world feed. However, it was later announced that ESPN would utilize Sky Sports' coverage. On 22 October 2022, ESPN recently extended their deal until 2025. Starting in 2023, Five races will be aired on ABC, with Monaco to be aired live on the network for the first time.

Formula 1 Online 
From 2018, Formula 1 officially started to show live streaming of each race online with many other features. The F1 TV service includes many other features like a live view of each driver's car and replay of all Formula 1 races.  F1 TV restricts viewing to the country of residence or the EU, and requires the user to have a valid credit card in that same country. Due to rights restrictions, if outside the EU, it is not possible to watch F1 TV from outside one's home country.

2023 broadcasters
These are the broadcasters for the 2023 Formula One World Championship.

Radio broadcasters

Official internet broadcasters

– Rights in Brunei, Cambodia, Hong Kong, Indonesia, Laos, Malaysia, Philippines, Singapore, Thailand and Timor Leste.

– Rights in parts of North America (except Mexico), South America (including Argentina for Fox Sports) and the Caribbean.

– Rights in Denmark, Estonia, Finland, Iceland, Latvia, Lithuania, Netherlands, Norway, Poland and Sweden.

World Feed producers

Current producers
Since the 2022 season, only the Monaco Grand Prix is not produced by FOM.

Former producers (1950–2021)

Below are the previous World Feed Producers for Grands Prix from 1950 until 2015.
 Between 1997 and 1999 the Brazilian GP World Feed was produced by FOM. What was shown was a reduced version of the F1 Digital+ main feed, mainly lacking onboard angles and without the pay per view graphics. Rede Globo continued to produce an alternative National Feed for Brazilian viewers.
 From 2001 to 2003, the Australian Grand Prix was produced and broadcast nationally in native widescreen (16:9) on Channel 9 Digital (2001–2002) and Channel 10 Digital (2003). For National Viewers watching on Analogue TV, they received a letterbox (14:9 feed in a 4:3 frame) version of the Feed, while international viewers got a standard 4:3 feed. When FOM took over the broadcast in 2004, the local coverage was reverted to 4:3 – from 2004 to 2006, only the Channel Ten studio, pit lane reporters and support races' onboard cameras were in widescreen.
 In 2001 and 2002 the US Grand Prix was broadcast locally by ABC Sports. However, they did not ever produce the World Feed.
 In 1991, the French GP was broadcast in France by La Cinq, which held rights for F1.

Commentators

Austria 
Live broadcasts of Formula One Championship races on ORF are commentated by ORF's sport correspondent Ernst Hausleitner with aid from Alexander Wurz. Occasionally other co-commentators like Adrian Sutil or Christian Klien substituted for Wurz. In 2021, they share the broadcast with ServusTV with different commentators. Andrea Schlager presenting the coverage, while Andreas Gröbl joined by Nico Hülkenberg and Christian Klien in the commentary position. Both broadcasters will each airing 12 races live.

For the entire 2015 Formula One season, Pascal Wehrlein was Hausleitner's main co-commentator.

With the beginning of the 2009 Formula One season, Hausleitner took over the Formula 1 commentator position from Heinz Prüller, who is a legend in Austrian television history because of his enthusiasm for the sport and immersion into the races.

Azerbaijan 
Since 2011 in Azerbaijan, the commentators for İdman TV are Siyavush Aliyev with Rahim Aliyev.

Belgium 
In Belgium, Dutch commentary on Play Sports is brought by Kris Wauters during qualifying and races.

While the French broadcast for RTBF has Gaëtan Vigneron as commentator for qualifying and races.

Brazil 
Live broadcasts of Formula One Championship races in the Band network are called by Sérgio Mauricio. Former IndyCar driver Felipe Giaffone and journalist Reginaldo Leme are serving as race analysts. Pit reports are provided by Mariana Becker.

On BandSports, all practices, qualifying and races are also called by Sérgio Maurício, with Brazilian motorsports journalist Reginaldo Leme and former F1 Test Driver Max Wilson serving as analysts. Pit reports are provided by Mariana Becker

Bulgaria
Ivan Tenchev, Trayan Sarafov, Georgi Ivanov and Momchil Manchev.

China
In China, the main commentator for CCTV is Sha Tong. The commentators for Great Sports (Shanghai Sports) are Li Bing, Ye Fei and Zhou Haoran. Main commentators for China Telecom are Chao Yiwen, Jin Haonan and Liuyao. Shi Yiying and Wang Weixin would also appear in some selected races. The main commentator for Guangdong Sports Channel is Zhang Haining, who uses Cantonese to comment the races.

Croatia 
Live broadcasts of Formula One Championship races and qualifications in Croatia are provided by Sport Klub. The commentators are Antonio Baković and Marijan Projić. Darjan Petrić commentates with Baković on Friday and when Projić is not available.

Eastern Europe (except Russia) 
Live broadcasts of Formula One Championship qualifications and races are available on Setanta Sports Eurasia. 

The commentary is conducted in three languages - Russian, Ukrainian and Georgian.  Vyacheslav Kobrzhitsky comments on qualifications and races in Russian.  In Ukrainian - Maxim Podzigun.

In the period from 2014 to 2015, Oleg Shibeko was the Formula 1 commentator at Setanta Sports. 

Also, since 2015, Artem Balenok began his work on Formula 1 broadcasts, who commentated on races until September 2018.  Until the end of the season, Formula 1 was commented by Roman Galimon, who was replaced for the 2019 season by Vladimir Klapan.

Vyacheslav Kobrzhytskyi has taken over as commentator from Volodymyr Klapan for 2020 season.

Finland 
Live broadcasts of Formula One Championship races were available on Viasat's pay-TV-channel V Sport + / 1 / 2. Current main commentator since 2017 is Niki Juusela. Before him Formula One Championship races commentate Matti Kyllönen (1985–2009) and Oskari Saari (2004–2016). Nowadays co-commentators are Ossi Oikarinen, Mika Salo, Toni Vilander, Aaro Vainio and Tommi Pärmäkoski.

France 
Full live coverage is available in France on Canal+. Current main commentator is the journalist Julien Fébreau, alongside the 1997 Canadian world champion Jacques Villeneuve. Former driver Franck Montagny and reporter Laurent Dupin are giving analysis from the paddock and pit lane.

Germany 
Since 2021, full live coverage is available on Sky Sport. Coverage led by Peter Hardenacke while commentary is provided by Sascha Roos alongside former F1 drivers Ralf Schumacher and Timo Glock. Sandra Baumgartner handling paddock reports. Coverage also available in Austria.

Greece 
In Greece, the commentators for COSMOTE TV (pay TV) are Kostas Psarras with Giannis-Marios Papadopoulos. In free-to-air coverage from ERT, main commentators are Nikos Korovilas with Ilias Papaioannou.

Hungary 
In Hungary, the commentator is Zoltán Szujó, who had been previously pit reporter between 2002 and 2012. The colour commentator is the former Seat Leon Eurocup Champion and the former chief-editor of F1 Racing Hungary, Gábor Wéber. The studio analysts are the two-time FIA European Truck Racing Championship champion, Norbert Kiss,  the two-time WTCC Yokohama Driver's Trophy winner and WTCR champion, Norbert Michelisz, and the current TCR Europe, former WTCC driver, Dániel Nagy. The pit reporters are (in changing each other) Róbert Bobák, Máté Ujvári and Ádám Szeleczki. The translator of the after-quali and after-race interviews is Lőrinc Pattantyűs-Ábrahám. The presenter is Andrea Petrovics-Mérei. From 2019 Spanish Grand Prix, Szujó left/was fired from M4 Sport channel, he was replaced on the race by Máté Ujvári. From the Monaco Grand Prix, Wéber taking the role of main commentator, Norbert Kiss and Norbert Michelisz, and Dániel Nagy are the colour commentators (in charge). The pit reporters also will taking part in broadcasting of the practices. The first Hungarian commentators were Sándor Dávid and Jenő Knézy. At one time Andrew Frankl also participated in the broadcasts. The most famous Hungarian commentator was László Palik, who commented the races between 1990 (French Grand Prix) and 2010 (British Grand Prix), who had a unique commenting style with emotions in exciting situations, also with funny moments, mistakes, but also teased his colleague, Gyula Czollner. Their couple was the most famous and notorious in the history of F1 broadcasting in Hungary.

Italy 
In Italy, Sky Italia's commentator is Carlo Vanzini, with co-commentary provided by ex-F1 driver and Ferrari test driver Marc Gené and journalist Roberto Chinchero. Davide Valsecchi, Matteo Bobbi serve as pit lane reporters. The paddock reporter is Mara Sangiorgio, and the presenter is Federica Masolin. On Rai Radio 1 the commentator is Massimo Angeletti.

Middle East and North Africa 
SSC covers all races live with the full coverage on practice sessions, qualifying and race in two languages. Jordanian Firas Nimri is the commentator in Arabic, alongside Khalil Beschir as the expert. English language commentary is covered by Australians Damien Reid and Phil Anson.

Netherlands 
All races with full coverage is broadcast on ViaPlay who replaces longtime broadcaster Ziggo Sport. ViaPlay coverage is fronted by Amber Brantsen joined with studio analysts Christijan Albers, Giedo van der Garde, Tom Coronel and Ho-Pin Tung. Former Formula 1 drivers Jos Verstappen, Mika Häkkinen and David Coulthard and nine-time 24 Hours of Le Mans champion Tom Kristensen will each contribute as international analysts. Commentary is provided by Nelson Valkenburg and Melroy Heemskerk while Stéphane Kox reports from pitlane.

Poland 
Since 2023, all races are broadcast by Viaplay, who replaced Eleven Sports. During pre-season test, sessions are commented by Bartosz Budnik, Bartosz Pokrzywiński, Robert Smoczyński, Maciej Jermakow, Paweł Baran, Aldona Marciniak, Kamila Kotulska and Patryk Sokołowski, ex Scuderia Ferrari and McLaren aerodynamics engineer. Aldona Marciniak is main studio host, with Kamila Kotulska and Patryk Sokołowski as tech analysts. In selected weekends, tech analysis will be provided by Marcin Budkowski. On-track reporters are Mikołaj Sokół and Michał Gąsiorowski.

Russia 
Since 2015 Formula One in Russia is broadcast on Match TV and Match! Arena including free practices. Vladimir Bashmakov comments on free practices and Alexey Popov along with Natalya Fabrichnova comment on qualifying sessions and races. Their contracts were terminated ahead of the 2022 season as a result of Russia's invasion of Ukraine.

Spain 
In the pay-per-view channel DAZN, which holds the rights of the entire championship exclusively in Spain from the 2021 season replacing Movistar F1, the main commentator is journalist Antonio Lobato. Co-commentators for the qualifying and the race are former Arrows, Jaguar, McLaren, Sauber and HRT driver Pedro de la Rosa and F1 engineer Toni Cuquerella, who worked for Williams, Ferrari, and HRT. Cuquerella is also the co-commentator for Free Practice 3 while journalists Jacobo Vega and Cristobal Rosaleny alternate the co-commentating on the Friday Free Practices. They comment from a TV studio in Madrid, except for the Spanish Grand Prix, where journalist Nira Juanco acts as presenter. Pit reporters are journalist Noemí de Miguel and former F1 mechanic in Super Aguri and HRT Albert Fàbrega. Also, Ferrari test driver Marc Gené provides analysis from the circuit before, during and/or after every session. Other contributors include Miguel Portillo and former GP2 driver Roldán Rodríguez.

In Teledeporte, the sports channel of the Spanish national public TV, which offers a 60-minutes time highlights of every race (except the Spanish Grand Prix, which is shown live in the TVE main channel La 1), journalist Marc Martí is the main commentator, with GP3 Series driver Alex Palou as co-commentator. In the live broadcast of the Spanish Grand Prix, they were joined by FIA World Endurance Championship and former Manor Marussia F1 driver Roberto Merhi and journalist Juan Carlos Garcia, who was the pit reporter.

In Catalan channel TV3, which has the same coverage as TVE, the main commentator is Francesc Latorre, with veteran journalist Francesc Rosés as co-commentator. In the live coverage of the Spanish Grand Prix, they were joined by former HRT and current DTM engineer Arnau Niubó, with journalist Jordi Gil as pit reporter.

Spanish-speaking Latin America 
Live broadcasts of Formula One Championship races on Mediapro-owned Canal F1 Latin America are called by lap-by-lap announcer Christian González Rouco, son of Argentine motorsports journalist Eduardo Gocuntlez Rouco, and grandson and grandnephew, respectively, of Isidro González Longhi and Andrés Rouco, with Colombian motorsports journalist Diego Mejía as race analyst. Pit reports are provided by Spanish sports journalist Nira Juanco, who previously worked on Antena 3's F1 broadcasts, and has been with Canal F1 since its launch in 2015.

In Mexico and Latin America, The races are called by Argentine motorsports journalist Fernando Tornello, with Mexican motorsports journalist Luis Manuel "Chacho" López as analysts and Juan Fossaroli handling the pit reports and pre-race interviews. This coverage is airing on Fox Sports Latin America (Mexico only), ESPN Latin America, Fox Sports Chile, STAR Premium Latin America, and also available on ESPN Deportes in the US. All broadcasters have the rights until 2022.

Televisa broadcasts in Mexico a one-hour almost complete race show hosted by Mexican sports journalists Rafael Bolaños and Carlos Jalife, sometimes accompanied by a third commentator which has been Ignacio Alva, Giselle Zarur or Sam Reyes in the past. The show edits the races to about 50 minutes from start to the checkered flag and is broadcast around midnight on race days on free air TV, channels 4 or 9 in Mexico. They also broadcast live the Mexican Grand Prix from Practice 1 to the Race from the Autódromo Hermanos Rodríguez, since 2015, with Rafael and Carlos accompanied by Eric Fisher. Televisa has done the broadcasting of F1 since the beginning of the century on free air TV and they used to do all the races live, sometimes delayed if the time zone was not Sunday daylight in Mexico, and now they are the only option if you don't have pay TV.

Turkey 
(Cine5) Emre Tilev and Aytaç Kot interpreted the 1995-1996-1997 seasons.
(NTV) Fuat akdağ-Erkan Arseven & Okay Karacan-Serra Yılmaz duo commented on the 7 seasons between 1998 and 2004, respectively.
(Cnn Turk) Cem Yılmaz-Serhan Acar duo interpreted the 2005–2008 seasons.
(TRT 2009-2010-2011) (Sporsmart, 2012-2013-2014-2016) (Tivibuspor and Ligtv 2015) (S Sport 2017-) Broadcast Channels.
Serhan Acar interpreted all the races from 2007 to the present.

United Kingdom, United States, Canada, Australia, and Ireland 
As of 2019, Sky Sports F1 is the primary English-language broadcaster within the UK. David Croft commentates with Martin Brundle or occasionally Paul di Resta. Depending on the race, one of Ted Kravitz or Karun Chandhok contributes from the pit lane. For practice sessions, Croft is often joined by Paul di Resta, Anthony Davidson, Johnny Herbert, or Chandhok with Brundle providing trackside analysis. Simon Lazenby hosts the coverage. This coverage is used for highlights on the F1 YouTube channel. Damon Hill, Nico Rosberg and Jenson Button, along with Brundle, Di Resta, Davidson, Herbert and Chandhok are the analysts, with Natalie Pinkham, Rachel Brookes and Craig Slater, as relief presenters and reporters who conduct interviews on the broadcast.

Coverage of the British Grand Prix is also covered live by Channel 4. Channel 4 also produces a highlights show for each race with an exclusive set of commentators. Play-by-play is handled by Alex Jacques, while ex-F1 driver David Coulthard acts as the analyst. Ben Edwards and Mark Webber occasionally cover for both Jacques and Coulthard respectively. Lawrence Barretto and Lee McKenzie serve as the main relief presenters and reporters. Steve Jones hosts the coverage. Eddie Jordan, Mark Webber, and Billy Monger also contribute as analysts.

An exclusive broadcast called "F1 Live" (previously called the "Pit Lane Channel" through 2021) is available to "F1 TV Pro" subscribers, alongside an exclusive commentary feed. Commentators as of 2021 include contributions from Will Buxton, Rosanna Tennant, Alex Brundle, Jordan King, and Sam Collins.

The official English-language radio coverage within the UK is produced by BBC Radio 5 Live, with Formula E lead commentator Jack Nicholls on play-by-play alongside ex-F1 driver Jolyon Palmer, presenter and reporter Jennie Gow and reporter Andrew Benson. Edwards again acts as occasional cover for Nicholls.

In the United States, ESPN airs the commercial-free broadcast produced by Sky Sports, with Croft and Brundle on commentary. From 2013 until the end of the 2017 season, NBC produced their own broadcast, with now-IndyCar lead commentator Leigh Diffey handling play-by-play alongside Steve Matchett, David Hobbs, and Buxton.

In Canada, TSN airs the Sky Sports broadcasts with commercials. TSN's lead F1 reporter is Tim Hauraney. In the province of Quebec, RDS broadcasts the race with Pierre Houde, Patrick Carpentier and Bertrand Houle as lead commentators.

In Australia, Foxtel airs the Sky Sports F1 commercial free coverage.
 
Both the Sky Sports and Channel 4 TV broadcasts are also available in the Republic of Ireland.

United States-Hispanic 
Univision Deportes served as the official F1 broadcaster for the Spanish community in the United States, with Sergio Rodriguez handling lap-by-lap commentary, Gustavo Roche handling race analysis and Christina Romero handling pit reports.

Since 2018, the broadcast is covered live by ESPN Deportes, using same crew as ESPN Latin America coverage.

References

Broadcasters
Formula One